On a Clear Day may refer to:

 On a Clear Day (film), a 2005 British drama film 
 On a Clear Day (George Shearing album), 1980 
 On a Clear Day (Shirley Scott album), 1966

See also
 "On a Clear Day (You Can See Forever)", a 1965 song by Burton Lane and Alan Jay Lerner, recorded by American vocalist Barbra Streisand
 On a Clear Day You Can See Forever, a 1965 musical
 On a Clear Day You Can See Forever (film), the 1970 film adaptation of that musical
 On a Clear Day I Can't See My Sister, the eleventh episode of the sixteenth season of The Simpsons